Maryukhino is a rural locality (a village) in Golovinskoye Rural Settlement, Sudogodsky District, Vladimir Oblast, Russia. The population was 8 as of 2010.

Geography 
Maryukhino is located on the Pol River, 34 km west of Sudogda (the district's administrative centre) by road. Rogovo is the nearest rural locality.

References 

Rural localities in Sudogodsky District